Huntsman's Quarry is a  geological Site of Special Scientific Interest in Gloucestershire, notified in 1974. The site is listed in the 'Cotswold District' Local Plan 2001-2011 (on line) as a Key Wildlife Site (KWS) and a Regionally Important Geological Site (RIGS).

Location and geology
The site lies in the Cotswold Area of Outstanding Natural Beauty and provides significant exposures of the Cotswold Slate facies of the Middle Jurassic period in the county. These slates have yielded a rich and diverse fauna and flora for research over a long period of time.  These include the remains of reptiles such as turtles, crocodiles, dinosaurs and pterosaurs.  Also found have been fish, starfish, barnacles, insects and biovalves. The site has also provided ammonites of significant biostratigraphical importance. The site has on-going potential for research into sediments and the environment of the area during the Middle Jurassic.

References

SSSI Source
 Natural England SSSI information on the citation
 Natural England SSSI information on the Huntsman's Quarry unit

External links
 Natural England (SSSI information)

Sites of Special Scientific Interest in Gloucestershire
Sites of Special Scientific Interest notified in 1974
Quarries in Gloucestershire
Cotswolds